David Gilman may refer to:
 David Gilman (writer), English television writer and novelist
 David Gilman (athlete) (born 1954), American luger and sprint canoer